South Canterbury Museum is a museum located in Timaru, New Zealand and owned by the Timaru District Council. Its collections include natural history specimens, Maori artefacts, European settlement and recent social history and documentary history. The museum houses a replica of the aeroplane local inventor Richard Pearse built and experimented with.

References

Museums in Canterbury, New Zealand
Timaru